is a Japanese international rugby union player who plays as a prop.

Club career

Ito joined Yamaha Júbilo ahead of the 2014–15 Top League season, but had to wait until the following year before making his debut.   His appearances during the 2015–16 season were largely from the replacements bench, however the following year, he established himself as a regular in the starting fifteen.

International

Ito was one of several Yamaha Júbilo players to receive their first call-up to Japan's senior squad ahead of the 2016 end-of-year rugby union internationals.

References

1990 births
Living people
Japanese rugby union players
Japan international rugby union players
Rugby union props
Shizuoka Blue Revs players
Sportspeople from Ōita Prefecture
Waseda University alumni
Waseda University Rugby Football Club players
Sunwolves players